Robert Mudražija (born 5 May 1997) is a Croatian professional footballer who plays as a midfielder for NK Slaven Belupo.

Early career
Born in Zagreb in 1997, Mudražija started his football career with Dinamo Zagreb. He left the team at the age of 15 when he joined NK Zagreb youth team.

Club career
Mudražija started his professional career with NK Zagreb in the Croatian First Football League in 2014. After spending two seasons with the club, he moved to FC Liefering of the Austrian second tier in 2016. In June 2017 he returned to Croatia where he joined Osijek.
On 28 January 2019, it was announced that Mudražija would be joining Copenhagen for an undisclosed fee believed to be around €3 million. On 26 January 2021, Copenhagen announced that Mudražija would be loaned to his native nation's Rijeka for a period of 18 months. In December 2021, he was loaned to Slovenian PrvaLiga side Olimpija Ljubljana.

International career
Mudražija was capped for the Croatian under-18, under-19, under-20, and under-21 sides.

Honours
Copenhagen
Danish Superliga: 2018–19

References

External links
 

1997 births
Living people
Footballers from Zagreb
Association football midfielders
Croatian footballers
Croatia youth international footballers
Croatia under-21 international footballers
NK Zagreb players
FC Liefering players
NK Osijek players
F.C. Copenhagen players
HNK Rijeka players
NK Olimpija Ljubljana (2005) players
NK Slaven Belupo players
Croatian Football League players
2. Liga (Austria) players
Danish Superliga players
Slovenian PrvaLiga players
Croatian expatriate footballers
Expatriate footballers in Austria
Expatriate men's footballers in Denmark
Expatriate footballers in Slovenia
Croatian expatriate sportspeople in Austria
Croatian expatriate sportspeople in Denmark
Croatian expatriate sportspeople in Slovenia